"Anyway You Want Me" ("Or Any Way You Want Me") may refer to:

 "Any Way You Want Me" (Elvis Presley song), a 1956 song by Elvis Presley
 "Anyway You Want Me" (Rednex song), a 2007 song by Rednex
 "Any Way That You Want Me", song written by Chip Taylor, covered by the Troggs, the American Breed, Evie Sands
 Any Way You Want Me, the re-issue title of the album Fresh Water by Alison McCallum
 "Any Way You Want Me" (Alison McCallum song), a song from the above album